Better Never to Have Been: The Harm of Coming into Existence is a 2006 book by South African philosopher David Benatar, best known for being associated with antinatalism and philosophical pessimism. The book was preceded by Benatar's 1997 paper "Why It Is Better Never to Come into Existence", where he expounded on what would eventually become the book's major concepts.

Summary 
Better Never to Have Been directly concerns Benatar's antinatalist philosophy: sentient beings are harmed when they are brought into existence, and it is therefore wrong to procreate. He derives this conclusion from two arguments: an asymmetry between good and bad things, such as pleasure and pain, and the view that human beings have an unreliable assessment of life's quality.

Asymmetry between pleasure and pain 

Benatar argues that there is what he calls an asymmetry between good and bad things, such as pleasure and pain:

 the absence of pain is good, even if that good is not enjoyed by anyone, whereas
 the absence of pleasure is not bad unless there is somebody for whom this absence is a deprivation.

His justification for this argument is that the absence of pleasure is only bad when somebody exists to experience that absence; if pleasure is absent and there is no person to be deprived of it, it is not bad.

On the subject of childlessness, he further writes that "the reason why we do not lament our failure to bring somebody into existence is because absent pleasures are not bad."

Critical reception 
In his review, philosopher Yujin Nagasawa questioned why Benatar framed Better Never to Have Been as a positive thesis, rather than as a counter-intuitive philosophical puzzle. As a result, Nagasawa felt that he could not recommend the book to everyone. Bioethicist David DeGrazia published a rebuttal to Benatar's arguments in 2010; despite the disagreement with Benatar's position, DeGrazia commended the book, stating: "I conclude with praise for his work and the intellectual virtues it embodies." In 2013, Benatar responded to critics of the book in the paper "Still Better Never to Have Been: A Reply to (More of) My Critics".

In popular culture 
The creator of True Detective, Nic Pizzolatto, has cited Better Never to Have Been as an influence on the creation of the character Rust Cohle.

References 

2006 non-fiction books
English-language books
Ethics books
Oxford University Press books
Philosophy books
Works about antinatalism
Works about philosophical pessimism